Sakhir TCR Round or variation, may refer to:

 2016 TCR International Series Sakhir round
 2017 TCR International Series Sakhir round

See also
 TCR International Series
 Touring car racing (TCR)
 Sakhir Grand Prix